Liz Carr is an English actress, comedian, broadcaster and international disability rights activist.

Early life and education
Carr was born 21 April 1972 in Port Sunlight and grew up in Bebington, Merseyside. She attended Upton Hall School FCJ in Upton, Merseyside and Birkenhead High School in Birkenhead. She studied law at the University of Nottingham.

Disability activism

Carr has used a wheelchair since the age of seven owing to arthrogryposis multiplex congenita and frequently refers to her condition in her stand-up as "meus thronus kaputus". She is frank about her life as a disabled person and the inherent comedy it brings: "I've had some tuts, which is fantastic... I look quite frail to some people, so it's like, 'She's talking about sex, she's swearing.' Every stereotype you didn't expect. People generally look terrified. 'Oh my God, is she going to be funny? Can we laugh at this?'"

Carr became involved in politics, disabled rights, and activism while studying at the University of Nottingham. Following her graduation she left law to work as a disability equality trainer. She has been a disability rights campaigner in the UK and has spoken at many rallies. In May 2008 she joined with ADAPT, a prominent disability rights group in the United States, to raise money for it and to protest presidential candidate John McCain's refusal to support the right of people with disabilities to live in their own homes.

In 2011, Carr was part of a Newsnight debate on assisted suicide, following the screening on the BBC of Terry Pratchett: Choosing to Die, which included Jeremy Paxman and David Aaronovitch. She opposed Lord Falconer's Assisted Dying Bill, stating: "I fear we’ve so devalued certain groups of people—ill people, disabled people, older people—that I don’t think it’s in their best interests to enshrine in law the right of doctors to kill certain people."

Career

Comedy
She has been part of a number of comedy groups, including Abnormally Funny People with Tanyalee Davis, Steve Day, Steve Best, Simon Minty and Chris McCausland.

In 2007 she was runner-up in the Hackney Empire New Act of the Year competition.

Carr co-hosted the BBC's Royal Television Society award-winning Ouch! Podcast with Mat Fraser from 2006 to 2013, and in 2011 worked as a researcher for the BBC comedy panel show Have I Got News for You.

Acting

Carr was in her thirties when she took on her first professional acting role, playing Mother Courage, before heading to the Young Vic with another Bertolt Brecht play, The Exception and the Rule. In 2013, she joined the long-running BBC crime thriller series Silent Witness as regular character Clarissa Mullery. On 5 February 2020 it was announced that she had departed the series after eight years.

In 2019, Carr starred in The OA as Dr Marlow Rhodes. In 2020, she appeared as a university lecturer in the miniseries Devs.

In March 2021, it was announced that Carr had joined the cast of The Witcher as Fenn in the show's second season. In December of the same year, it was announced that she had joined the cast of Good Omens for the second season, as the angel Saraqael. Between September and December 2021, she played Dr. Emma Brookner in the West End revival of The Normal Heart at the Royal National Theatre, marking the first time a disabled person had played the role on stage. She subsequently won the Laurence Olivier Award for Best Actress in a Supporting Role at the 2022 Laurence Olivier Awards.

Personal life
In 2010 Carr entered into a civil partnership with longtime partner Jo Church in what Carr called "A Wheelie Special Wedding". Her father gave a speech in which he was prohibited from using words like "brave." Carr and her partner danced to the Dirty Dancing theme and the local fire brigade held her, and her chair, aloft.

On 10 August 2017, Carr and her personal assistant were the victims of an attack by a man armed with scissors. The assailant was subsequently arrested and detained under the Mental Health Act 2007.

Filmography

Film

Television

Stage

References

External links
 
 

1972 births
Living people
Actors with disabilities
Alumni of the University of Nottingham
British disability rights activists
English people with disabilities
English television actresses
English women comedians
LGBT actresses
British LGBT comedians
English LGBT actors
People from Bebington
Wheelchair users